Jenn Bennett is an American author of novels for teens and adults. Her notable works include Alex, Approximately, Starry Eyes, and The Anatomical Shape of a Heart (aka Night Owls). Her books have received critical acclaim and award recognition.

Personal life 

Bennett was born in Germany. She has a Bachelor of Fine Arts in Painting and worked on her master's degree at Louisiana State University. Due to her father's service in the United States Army, she grew up as a military brat, moving to a number of places and traveling extensively in Europe and the Far East. She currently resides in Atlanta with her husband.

Publishing career

Arcadia Bell series 

Bennett's debut novel, Kindling the Moon released from Pocket Books in July 2011, and is the first book in the Arcadia Bell series. The final book in the series, Banishing the Dark, was published in 2015; it was nominated for a "Reviewers' Choice Book Award.

Roaring Twenties series 

In 2013, Berkley Books published the first book in Bennett's new historical paranormal romance series, Bitter Spirits, taking place in a haunted 1920s San Francisco. It garnered starred reviews from both Publishers Weekly and Booklist and was one of six romances published in 2014 to be named on Publishers Weekly's Best Books of 2014. The final book in the series, Grave Phantoms, was awarded RT Book Reviews' Seal of Excellence.

Young Adult fiction 

In 2015, Macmillan Publishers published Bennett's debut young adult contemporary book, The Anatomical Shape of a Heart, a romance between two aspiring teen artists. Titled Night Owls internationally, foreign rights for the book were also acquired by Simon & Schuster UK, and it was translated into five languages It won a 2015 Reviewers' Choice Award for YA Protagonist from RT Book Reviews and the 2016 RITA Award for Young Adult Romance.

In 2017, Simon and Schuster published her second young adult book, Alex, Approximately, a teen update of You've Got Mail. It received starred reviews from Kirkus Reviews and Booklist, and it was translated into seven languages.

Bennett's third young adult book, Starry Eyes, about two teens who get lost in the California wilderness, was published in 2018 and received a starred review from Kirkus Reviews and was nominated for a Goodreads Choice Award for Young Adult Fiction. It has been translated into five languages.

Bibliography

Arcadia Bell series 

Kindling the Moon  (July 2011) 
Summoning the Night (April 2012)
Leashing the Tempest (December 2012) 
Binding the Shadows (May 2013)
Banishing the Dark (May 2014)

Roaring Twenties series 

Bitter Spirits (January 2014)
Grim Shadows (June 2014)
Grave Phantoms (May 2015)

Young adult books 

The Anatomical Shape of a Heart – UK edition titled Night Owls (November 3, 2015) 
Alex, Approximately (April 2017)
Starry Eyes (April 2018)
Serious Moonlight (April 2019)
The Lady Rogue (September 2019)
Chasing Lucky (May 2020)
Always Jane (March 2022)

References

External links 
 Author's Website
 Listing at Goodreads
 

Living people
21st-century American novelists
American writers of young adult literature
American fantasy writers
Urban fantasy writers
American romantic fiction writers
Writers from Atlanta
American women novelists
Women writers of young adult literature
21st-century American women writers
Women romantic fiction writers
Women science fiction and fantasy writers
Novelists from Georgia (U.S. state)
1978 births